Victoria Agyei (born 15 May 1996 ) is a Ghanaian footballer who plays as a goalkeeper for the Ghana women's national football team.

Club career 
In August 2021, she sign a year deal with Ergotelis W.F.C. Before joining Ergotelis in Greece, Agyei was in the post for  Kumasi Sport Academy Ladies F.C.

International career 
Agyei was part of the Ghanaian team at the FIFA 2012 FIFA U-17 Women's World Cup held in Azerbaijan. The team under the leadership of Coach Mas-Ud Dramani won bronze in the tournament. She competed for Ghana Black Princesses in 2014 and 2016 FIFA U-20 Women's World Cup in Canada and  Papua New Guinea respectively. Agyei was invited by coach Mercy Tagoe-Quarcoo to compete for the Ghana Black Queens in Aisha Buhari Cup.

Honours 

 Player of The Match – Canada Vs. Ghana ( 2014 FIFA U-20 Women's World Cup)

References 

Living people
1996 births
Ghanaian women's footballers
Women's association football goalkeepers
Ghanaian expatriate women's footballers